Antonio Élie (December 9, 1893 – January 15, 1968) was a Canadian politician and a ten-term Member of the Legislative Assembly of Quebec.

Background

He was born in Baie-du-Febvre, Quebec and was a farmer.  He served as a city councillor in Baie-du-Febvre, Quebec in 1923 and 1924.

Member of the legislature

Élie ran as a Conservative candidate in 1931 and won, becoming the Member for the district of Yamaska.

He was re-elected in 1935, as a Union Nationale candidate in 1936, 1939, 1944, 1948, 1952, 1956, 1960 and 1962.

Minister without Portfolio

Élie was appointed Minister in the Cabinet of Maurice Duplessis, serving as Minister without Portfolio from 1936 to 1939 and from 1944 to 1958.  He did not run for re-election in 1966.

Death

He died on January 15, 1968.

References

1893 births
1968 deaths
Conservative Party of Quebec MNAs
Union Nationale (Quebec) MNAs